Julio Ramírez may refer to:
 Julio Ramírez (baseball) (born 1977), Major League Baseball center fielder
 Julio Ramirez (academic), professor of psychology
 Julio César Ramírez (born 1974), Uruguayan footballer
 Joel Maximo (Julio Ramirez, born 1979), professional wrestler with The S.A.T.